Roland Steuk (born 5 March 1959 in Berlin) is a retired East German hammer thrower.

At the 1977 European Athletics Junior Championships he won the hammer throw and took a silver medal in shot put. On the senior level he won the silver medal at the 1978 European Athletics Championships, finished fourth at the 1980 Summer Olympics, seventh at the 1982 European Athletics Championships and twelfth at the 1983 World Championships.

Representing the sports team TSC Berlin, he became East German champion six years in a row in the years 1978-1983.

International competitions

References

1959 births
Living people
Athletes from Berlin
German male hammer throwers
East German male hammer throwers
Olympic athletes of East Germany
Athletes (track and field) at the 1976 Summer Olympics
Athletes (track and field) at the 1980 Summer Olympics
World Athletics Championships athletes for East Germany
European Athletics Championships medalists